Roy Starrs (born 1946) is a British-Canadian scholar of Japanese literature and culture who teaches at the University of Otago in New Zealand. He has written critical studies of the major Japanese writers Yasunari Kawabata, Naoya Shiga, Osamu Dazai, and Yukio Mishima, and edited books on Asian nationalism (especially ethnic nationalism, religious nationalism, and cultural nationalism), globalization, pan-Asianism, Japanese modernism, and cultural responses to disaster in Japan. He has also published essays on Japan-related topics such as the Kojiki, Lafcadio Hearn and Japanese calligraphy.

Roy Starrs is also the Japan editor of the online The Literary Encyclopedia.

Starrs was born in Birmingham, England on November 18, 1946 and became a Canadian citizen as an adult. He received his Ph.D. from the University of British Columbia in 1986 and previously taught at U.B.C., Union College (New York), and Aarhus University (Denmark).

Works by Roy Starrs
  .
 An Artless Art - The Zen Aesthetic of Shiga Naoya: A Critical Study with Selected Translations. RoutledgeCurzon (1998). .
 "Writing the National Narrative: Changing Attitudes Towards Nation-Building Among Japanese Writers, 1900-1930", in Japan’s Competing Modernities: Issues in Culture and Democracy, 1900-1930. S. Minichiello ed. Honolulu, University of Hawaii Press (1998), pp. 161–189  (cloth)  (paper).
 
 
 
 "Nation and Region in the Work of Dazai Osamu," in Roy Starrs  
 "The Road to Violent Action: Mishima Yukio," in Fascism: Critical Concepts in Political Science, volume 5 (Postwar Fascisms), edited by Roger Griffin with Matthew Feldman. London; New York: Routledge. (Part of the Routledge Major Work series.) (2004), pp. 249–266. .
"The Kojiki as Japan's National Narrative," in Asian Futures, Asian Traditions, edited by Edwina Palmer. Folkestone, Kent: Global Oriental. .
 "Lafcadio Hearn as Japanese Nationalist," in Nichibunken Japan Review: Journal of the International Research Center for Japanese Studies, Number 18, 2006, pp. 181–213.
 "Ink Traces of the Dancing Calligraphers: Zen-ei Sho in Japan Today," in Henry Johnson and Jerry C. Jaffe, eds. Performing Japan: Contemporary Expressions of Cultural Identity London, Global Oriental and Honolulu: University of Hawai’i Press (2008). .
 "Politics and Religion in Japan," in Religion Compass 3/4 (2009), pp. 752–769. (http://www.blackwell-compass.com/subject/religion/)
 "A Devil of a Job: Mishima and the Masochistic Drive," in "Angelaki" (2009), Volume 14, Issue 3 December 2009, pp. 85–99. (http://www.informaworld.com/10.1080/09697250903407583)
 Modernism and Japanese Culture,  London/New York: Palgrave Macmillan, 2011. (http://www.palgrave.com/products/title.aspx?pid=360186)
 ed., "Politics and Religion in Modern Japan: Red Sun, White Lotus,"  London/New York: Palgrave Macmillan, 2011. (http://www.palgrave.com/products/title.aspx?pid=385916) 
 "Zen, Japan, and the Art of Democracy,"  in the "New Statesman," July 4, 2011. (http://www.newstatesman.com/asia/2011/07/japan-essay-nature-earthquake)
 ed., "Rethinking Japanese Modernism,"  Leiden and Boston: Brill, 2012. (http://www.brill.nl/rethinking-japanese-modernism)
  (http://www.brill.com/products/book/when-tsunami-came-shore)
 “La estética Zen de Muga (Ni-Ego) en el proyecto Renga de Octavio Paz.” In Rogelio Guedea, editor, Países en tránsito: estudios de literatura comparada. Oxford: Peter Lang, 2016.
 “Renga: A European Poem and its Japanese Model.” Comparative Literature Studies (May 2017).
 “Japanese Poetry and the Aesthetics of Disaster.” In Minh, N., New Essays in Japanese Aesthetics.  Lexington: Rowman and Littlefield, 2017.
 “Japan’s Perennial New Man: The Liberal and Fascist Incarnations of Masamichi Rōyama.” In Matthew Feldman et al, editors, The ‘New Man’ in Radical Right Ideology and Practice, 1919-45. London: Bloomsbury, 2018. 
 "The Fortunes of Pan-Asianism: Past, Present and Future." In The Journal of World History. (University of Hawai'i Press, June 2018).
 "The Tokyo Gas Attack Was Japan’s 9/11.” In Fair Observer, July 11, 2018. (https://www.fairobserver.com/region/asia_pacific/tokyo-gas-attack-aum-shinrikyo-executions-japan-news-this-week-16521/)

External links
http://www.otago.ac.nz/languagescultures/people/otago063368.html Roy Starrs’ homepage.
http://shinku.nichibun.ac.jp/jpub/pdf/jr/JN1805.pdf essay by Roy Starrs on "Lafcadio Hearn as a Japanese Nationalist."
http://www.nzasia.org.nz/downloads/NZJAS-June02/Starrs.pdf A review article by Roy Starrs on "Japanese Literature as a Modern Invention."
http://muse.jhu.edu/journals/journal_of_japanese_studies/v030/30.2starrs.pdf A review by Roy Starrs on Confluences: Postwar Japan and France, edited by Doug Slaymaker.
http://www.the-tls.co.uk/tls/reviews/literature_and_poetry/article752043.ece A review by the poet Anthony Thwaite behind the paywall of the Times Literary Supplement of Roy Starrs’ book on Kawabata, Soundings in Time.
http://www.timeshighereducation.co.uk/story.asp?storyCode=158901&sectioncode=21 A review by Stephen Dodd in the Times Higher Educational Supplement of Roy Starrs’ book on Kawabata, Soundings in Time.
http://www.newstatesman.com/node/154008 An article by Jason Cowley on Yasunari Kawabata in the New Statesman based partly on Roy Starrs’ book on Kawabata, Soundings in Time.
http://jas.sagepub.com/cgi/reprint/34/2/239.pdf A review by Steven Heine on Roy Starrs' book on Shiga Naoya, An Artless Art: The Zen Aesthetic of Shiga Naoya.

1946 births
Living people
British emigrants to Canada
Academic staff of the University of Otago
Japanese literature academics